The original Old Town Methodist Church, built in 1890, is an historic wooden Methodist church building now situated behind the Old Town United Methodist Church built in 1983 a short distance west of the intersection of U.S. 19 and Road 349 in Old Town, Florida. Built by  Ed Hill and Charlie Hill at another location in Old Town, it has been moved several times before reaching its present site. In the 1980s, it was used as an annex to the new building. Today it serves as the Fellowship Hall.
 

In 1989, the 1890 church building was listed in A Guide to Florida's Historic Architecture, published by the University of Florida Press.

Old Town United Methodist Church is still an active congregation. The Rev. Carl F. Rainear is its pastor.

References

External links

Churches in Dixie County, Florida
United Methodist churches in Florida
1890 establishments in Florida
Churches completed in 1890